Qin Lan (born 17 July 1979) is a Chinese actress, model, and singer. She is known for her roles as Empress Fuca in Story of Yanxi Palace, Zhihua in My Fair Princess III and Mo Xiangwan in We Are All Alone.

Career
Qin won a Golden Award in the Advertisement Model category of the 1999 National Nominate Newcomer Competition. In February 2003, when Taiwanese writer Chiung Yao and her team were holding auditions in Beijing, Qin was selected from a pool of 200 candidates to play a new character, Chen Zhihua in the television series My Fair Princess III.

In 2013, she was shortlisted for Best Supporting Actress in the 7th Asian Film Awards for the role of Empress Lü Zhi in The Last Supper.

In 2015, Qin began to start working as a producer. In addition to setting up a studio to handle her acting career, she also established a business for developing films.

By 2017, Qin had successfully produced two online television series.

Qin is also known for her role as Empress Fucha in the 2018 hit historical drama Story of Yanxi Palace.

In 2020, Qin starred in the workplace drama We Are All Alone, playing an iron-willed agent.

Qin participated in the period drama series “Legacy,” which will premiere exclusively on WarnerMedia’s regional streaming service HBO Go at an unspecified date later in 2021. “Legacy” is a 1920s-set drama that chronicles the lives of the wealthy Yi family and three sisters who vie to inherit their father’s shopping mall business. In a time of upheaval and uncertainty, the three sisters set aside their differences to keep the business afloat and save their families.

Personal life
Qin graduated from the Shenyang University of Technology. She was in a relationship with Huang Xiaoming from 2003 to 2006.

In March 2021, similar to the actions of most Chinese celebrities, Qin publicly announced her support for cotton from the Xinjiang region after several overseas companies announced they will not purchase cotton from the region due to concerns over forced labour of Uyghurs.

Filmography

Film

Television series

Discography

Awards and nominations

References

External links
 
 Qin Lan at hkmdb.com

Living people
1979 births
Actresses from Shenyang
Musicians from Shenyang
Singers from Liaoning
Chinese film actresses
Chinese television actresses
21st-century Chinese actresses
21st-century Chinese women singers